698 Ernestina (prov. designation:  or ) is a background asteroid, approximately  in diameter, located in the outer regions of the asteroid belt. It was discovered on 5 March 1910, by German astronomer Joseph Helffrich at the Heidelberg-Königstuhl State Observatory. The presumed carbonaceous C-type asteroid has a rotation period of 5.0 hours. It was named after Ernst Wolf, son of German astronomer and prolific discoverer of minor planets, Max Wolf.

Orbit and classification 

Ernestina is a non-family asteroid of the main belt's background population when applying the hierarchical clustering method to its proper orbital elements. It orbits the Sun in the outer asteroid belt at a distance of 2.5–3.2 AU once every 4 years and 10 months (1,773 days; semi-major axis of 2.87 AU). Its orbit has an eccentricity of 0.11 and an inclination of 12° with respect to the ecliptic. The body's observation arc begins with its official discovery observation on 5 March 1910.

Naming 

This minor planet was named after Ernst Wolf, son of German astronomer Max Wolf (1863–1932), who has discovered many asteroids at Heidelberg including some of the first near-Earth objects and Jupiter trojans. The  was mentioned in The Names of the Minor Planets by Paul Herget in 1955.

Physical characteristics 

Ernestina is an assumed carbonaceous C-type asteroid. In a taxonomic classification based on MOVIS near-infrared colors, the asteroid's preliminary determined Cgx-type was ultimately rejected and its final class changed to "undefined" (U). MOVIS data has been obtained by the VISTA Hemisphere Survey using the VISTA telescope at Paranal Observatory in Chile.

Rotation period 

In October 2005, a rotational lightcurve of Ernestina was obtained from photometric observations by an international collaboration led by Donald Pray at Carbuncle Hill Observatory . Lightcurve analysis gave a well-defined rotation period of  hours with a brightness variation of  magnitude.

Poles 

Each modeled lightcurve also determined two spin axes of (213.0°, −66.0°) and (76.0°, −49.0°), as well as (282.0°, −79.0°) and (114.0°, −45.0°) in ecliptic coordinates (λ, β), respectively.

Diameter and albedo 

The Collaborative Asteroid Lightcurve Link derives an albedo of 0.1064 and a diameter of 26.92 kilometers based on an absolute magnitude of 10.9.

References

External links 
 Lightcurve Database Query (LCDB), at www.minorplanet.info
 Dictionary of Minor Planet Names, Google books
 Asteroids and comets rotation curves, CdR – Geneva Observatory, Raoul Behrend
 Discovery Circumstances: Numbered Minor Planets (1)-(5000) – Minor Planet Center
 
 

000698
Discoveries by Joseph Helffrich
Named minor planets
19100305